John Everit House is a historic home located at Melville in Suffolk County, New York. It was built about 1820 and is a -story, three-bay, shingled dwelling with a -story, two-bay east wing. Also on the property are a shed, bar, and well.

It is one of the earliest houses in the historic district and has a stone foundation. By 1873 it belonged to Dr. George Conklin, who enlarged it for his medical practice. The first meeting of the Session of the Sweet Hollow Church likely met here in 1829.

It was added to the National Register of Historic Places in 1985.

References

Houses on the National Register of Historic Places in New York (state)
Houses completed in 1820
Houses in Suffolk County, New York
National Register of Historic Places in Suffolk County, New York